Malhama Tactical is a private military contractor operating in the Syrian Civil War. The group, founded by a pseudonymous Uzbeki jihadist called Abu Rofiq, is closely allied with Jabhat Fateh al-Sham and its successor group Tahrir al-Sham. Its around dozen members occasionally participate in combat and run guns, but primarily provide training. The company has worked with Ahrar al-Sham and the Turkistan Islamic Party. According to the pro-government Al-Masdar News, its leader Abu Rofiq was killed in an airstrike on 7 February 2017, though his death has been questioned. The group stands in opposition to ISIS

History 

The company was founded in 2015 and came to prominence in early 2017. However, according to the Twitter account of the current leader of Malhama Tactical, Abu Salman Belarus, the group has been active since 2013 in what he has described as "emergency aid on the battlefield." They have been noted for their prolific and successful use of social media to advertise their services. Malhama Tactical is active in the Idlib-Aleppo region. Fighters are noted to be considerably better trained than other Syrian fighters, although not as good as Western soldiers, and to be very well equipped. According to Al-Masdar, they are well trained in medical care, which allows them to reduce their casualties.

In May and July 2017, Malhama Tactical conducted raids against government forces in the western Aleppo Governorate alongside Ajnad al-Kavkaz. In November 2018, Malhama Tactical together with Tahrir al-Sham conducted a night raid on a Syrian Army & Russian base, in which allegedly 25 soldiers were killed, seven of whom were Russians. After the  death of Abu Salman (Abu Rofiq), Ali Al-Shishani became the new leader of Malhama Tactical.

Due to its high level of specialization, organization and usage it has been dubbed the "Blackwater of Jihad".

External links 
 Official Website

References

Anti-government factions of the Syrian civil war